Víctor Pujol Sala (born 4 October 1967 in Barcelona, Catalonia) is a former field hockey midfielder from Spain. He won the silver medal with the men's national team at the 1996 Summer Olympics in Atlanta, Georgia. There he scored the only goal for the Spaniards in the final against the Netherlands (1–3).

References

External links
 
Spanish Olympic Committee

1967 births
Living people
Spanish male field hockey players
Male field hockey midfielders
Olympic field hockey players of Spain
Field hockey players at the 1992 Summer Olympics
Field hockey players at the 1996 Summer Olympics
1998 Men's Hockey World Cup players
Field hockey players from Barcelona
Olympic medalists in field hockey
Medalists at the 1996 Summer Olympics
Olympic silver medalists for Spain
Club Egara players